Pycnochromis lineatus is a chromis from the Indo-Pacific. It occasionally makes its way into the aquarium trade. It grows to a size of 7 cm in length.

References

External links
 

lineata
Fish described in 1928